Balloon Fiesta may refer to the following:
Albuquerque International Balloon Fiesta
Bristol International Balloon Fiesta
Philippine International Hot Air Balloon Fiesta
Saga International Balloon Fiesta (in Japan)
Saxonia International Balloon Fiesta

For a complete list of balloon festivals, see Hot air balloon festival.

Hot air balloon festivals